Dr. Nkem Okeke  is a Nigerian Politician who was the Deputy Governor of Anambra State from 17 March 2014 to 17 March 2022  He first served as Anambra State Commissioner for Economic Planning, and again as Anambra State Commissioner for Works and Transport in the administration of Governor Peter Obi and later went back to immerse himself in academia as lecturer and head of department of economics at Nnamdi Azikiwe University.

Early life and education 
His Excellency, Dr. Nkemakonam Chukwukaodinaka Okeke was born in Zaria on January 13, 1960 to the family of late Chief Richard Nwachukwu Okeke and Chief Mrs. Dorothy Nwakaego Okeke of Umuezu Awovu Village, Enugwu-Ukwu in Anambra State. He is married to Mrs. Oby Okeke and they are blessed with five children.

He attended Denis Memorial Grammar School (DMGS) Onitsha and St. Finbarr’s College Akoka, Lagos and later got admission to University of Wisconsin, Madison USA in 1978, where he graduated with a Bachelor of Science (B.Sc.) degree in Civil and Environmental Engineering in 1981.

His desire for higher education saw him through Howard University, Washington DC, USA where he obtained an MBA in Management in 1983, and a PhD in Economics (Monetary Economics) at the same Howard University, USA, in 1992.

Professional career 
Dr. Okeke has had a distinguished professional career, which commenced with remarkable services rendered in various departments of Fairfax County Government, Virginia, USA, as an Engineer and later as a Management Analyst. He returned to Nigeria in 1994, and joined the private sector through the family Construction Company, Renacs Engineering Nigeria Limited as Executive Director, until 2002 when he went into public service, based on his desire to further contribute to the development of Anambra State and Nigeria in general.

Starting with the academic sector, he held various positions in Nnamdi Azikiwe University, Awka that includes Lecture II, Faculty of Social Science, Economics Department (2002 – 2005), and Acting Head, Department of Economics (January – July 2006).

In October 2007, he returned to the Economics Department of Nnamdi Azikiwe University As Lecturer I until October 2008, when he was promoted to Senior Lecturer and served as Acting Head of Department in September 2009 at the University.

Dr. Okeke has always stood tall among his contemporaries during his services at the University and in various offices, he has held, particularly in Nnamdi Azikiwe University where among other positions, he was Member, Departmental Development Committee (2005); Member, Faculty Development Committee (2005); Staff Adviser, Nigerian Economic Students Association (NESA) 2004 – 2005; Part-Time Lecturer, Enugu State University of Science and Technology (ESUT); Business School (Executive Postgraduate Studies), Enugu (2003 – 2005); Chairman, Departmental Accreditation Task Force Committee (2007); Chairman, Examination Committee and Departmental Examination Officer (2007 – August 2009); Member, Faculty Conference Committee (2008 – 2009) and Vice Chairman, Convocation and Ceremonial Committee (2009).

He has authored or co-authored notable publications, and is a Member of many professional associations, including Nigeria Economic Society (NES); Institute of Chartered Economists of Nigeria, ICEN (formerly known as the Institute of Certified Economists of Nigeria); Council for the Regulation of Engineering in Nigeria (COREN); and the Nigeria Society of Engineers (NSE).

Political career 
In 2006, Dr. Okeke was appointed as Commissioner for Economic Planning and Development, and also served in the same Cabinet as the Commissioner for Works, Housing, and Transport.

Dr. Okeke has been recognized severally for his immensely positive impact on the institutions he has worked in, couple to his very commendable political contributions. He served meritoriously in his First Tenure as the most diligent and celebrated Deputy Governor of Anambra State from March 2014 to March 2017, religiously implementing His Excellency’s Policy Direction to actualize the admirable vision and mission of the present administration.

He is the statutory Chairman of the State Boundary Committee, and the Chairman of the Christian and Muslim Pilgrims Welfare Boards.  His outstanding and remarkable intellectual contributions, has earned him appointments into Chairing many EXCO Committees as directed by the Governor.  He has occasionally represented His Excellency at various State, National and International functions, hence remained very instrumental to the development of the Anambra State and her people.

His Excellency, Dr. Nkemakonam Okeke became the first in the history of Anambra State to be re-elected as the Deputy Governor of Anambra State in the 2017 Gubernatorial Election. However, in 2021, he move from All Progressives Grand Alliance (APGA) to All Progressives Congress (APC).

References

Living people
All Progressives Grand Alliance politicians
Anambra State politicians
Igbo people
Nigerian Roman Catholics
Nigerian economists
Year of birth missing (living people)